Antofagasta de la Sierra is a village in Catamarca Province, Argentina. It is the head town of the Antofagasta de la Sierra Department.

Antofagasta de la Sierra is a high altitude settlement, the majority of its inhabitants are descended from the Diaguitas and Atacameños.

Economy

The local economy is based on agriculture and farming; the residents keep sheep and llama and grow vegetables. Tourism plays an important part in the local economy as many tourists come to see the nearby mountains, volcanoes and calderas, including Galán caldera and the Antofagasta de la Sierra volcanic field. The village holds an annual Festival of the dead.

External links

 Catamarca Guide

Populated places in Catamarca Province
Puna de Atacama